Potassium sulfite is the inorganic compound with the formula K2SO3.  It is the salt of potassium cation and sulfite anion.  It is a white solid that is highly soluble in water.

Use
Potassium sulfite is widely used for preserving food and beverages.

Production and reactions 

Potassium sulfite is produced by the thermal decomposition of potassium metabisulfite at 190°C:  
K2S2O5 → K2SO3 + SO2

References 

Potassium compounds
Sulfites